Avestan is a Unicode block containing characters devised for recording the Zoroastrian religious texts, Avesta, and was used to write the Middle Persian, or Pazand language.

History
The following Unicode-related documents record the purpose and process of defining specific characters in the Avestan block:

References 

Unicode blocks